Laurent de Palmas (born 29 October 1977 in Miramas, Provence-Alpes-Côte d'Azur) is a French retired footballer who played as either a right or left back.

External links

1977 births
Living people
French footballers
Association football defenders
Ligue 2 players
Nîmes Olympique players
AS Cannes players
Segunda División players
Segunda División B players
Racing de Ferrol footballers
UD Almería players
Elche CF players
French expatriate footballers
Expatriate footballers in Spain
French expatriate sportspeople in Spain
Sportspeople from Bouches-du-Rhône
Footballers from Provence-Alpes-Côte d'Azur